Jürgen Alzen (born 26 November 1962 in Kirchen, Rhineland-Palatinate) is a race car driver from Germany. 

He drove one race in both the FIA GT Championship and the American Le Mans Series of 2001 for his own Alzen Porsche team. He has also raced in Australia appearing in both the 2002 and 2003 Bathurst 24 Hour races held at the Mount Panorama Circuit. Alzen finished the 2003 race in 4th outright and 1st in Class B driving a Porsche 996 GT3 S Cup.

Jürgen Alzen and his younger brother Uwe Alzen were driving also at the Nürburgring Nordschleife VLN Endurance racing series and 24 Hours Nürburgring, in 2003 to 2005 in their privately built Porsche 996. Per regulations the car was entered as "911 Turbo", which permitted all wheel drive and turbocharging, but little was left of the road car. The engine had more in common with the mid engine 911 GT1 variants. In the following years this topic off highly modified Porsches 'harassing the works effort' was kept up with a turbo variant of the 911 997 and later a privately build race version of the then new Cayman, equipped with the 997 GT3 race engine. The success of that car in particular resulted in dispute between Porsche and Alzen Motorsport (Porsche saw its new 997 GT3 works effort put into bad light), and lastly caused team Alzen to abandon the Porsche brand in favour of running a GT3 variant of the Ford GT.

Jürgen holds the shared record of most overall wins with 28.

Uwe Alzen holds the lap record there at 8:09, about 10 seconds faster than the factory cars of Opel and Audi from the DTM, as well as the BMW M3 V8 GTR of Schnitzer Motorsport. He also has beaten them for the pole positions, yet his car failed at the start of the 2005 wet race.

External links
 Jürgen Alzen Motorsport

1962 births
Living people 
People from Kirchen
German racing drivers 
Racing drivers from Rhineland-Palatinate
International GT Open drivers

Nürburgring 24 Hours drivers